is the thirty-fifth single of Japanese female idol group Morning Musume. The song's title was chosen in accordance to the habit of eating mandarin oranges while sitting by a kotatsu, as a representation of each member's childhood memories. Mikan's Promotional video extends this concept further, by showing photographs of the members when they were children. It was released on November 21, 2007.

Like its predecessor, there are three editions. Limited edition A is accompanied by a bonus DVD, while a 40-page booklet is available in limited edition B enclosed in a special package. The catalog numbers of each limited edition copies are EPCE-5514 and EPCE-5515, respectively. The regular edition has a catalog number EPCE-5517. The limited and first press of the regular comes with one of ten photo cards, there is one for each member and one for the group.

Track listing 
All lyrics are written by Tsunku.

CD

Members 
 5th generation: Ai Takahashi, Risa Niigaki
 6th generation: Eri Kamei, Sayumi Michishige, Reina Tanaka
 7th generation: Koharu Kusumi
 8th generation: Aika Mitsui, Junjun, Linlin

Personnel 
 Ai Takahashi – main vocals, chorus
 Risa Niigaki – center vocal, chorus
 Eri Kamei – center vocal
 Sayumi Michishige – center vocal
 Reina Tanaka – main vocals
 Koharu Kusumi – center vocal
 Aika Mitsui – center vocal
 Junjun – minor vocal
 Linlin – minor vocal

Mikan 
  – programming, guitar
  – guitar

Bon Kyu! Bon Kyu! Bomb Girl 
  – programming, guitar
 Yasui Sano – drums
 Katsuhiro Mafune – bass
 Masanori Suzuki – trumpet
 Yoshinari Takegami – alto sax, tenor sax, baritone sax

Oricon ranks and sales

References

External links 
 Mikan entry on the Up-Front Works official website
 Projecthello.com lyrics: Mikan, Bon kyu! Bon kyu! Bomb Girl

Morning Musume songs
Zetima Records singles
2007 singles
Songs written by Tsunku
Song recordings produced by Tsunku
Japanese-language songs
2007 songs